The 2012 Grand Prix SAR La Princesse Lalla Meryem was a professional women's tennis tournament played on outdoor clay courts. It was the twelfth edition of the tournament which was part of the WTA International tournaments of the 2012 WTA Tour. It took place in Fés, Morocco between 23 and 29 April 2012. Qualifier Kiki Bertens won the singles title.

Singles main draw entrants

Seeds

 1 Rankings are as of April 16, 2012

Other entrants
The following players received wildcards into the singles main draw:
  Anabel Medina Garrigues
  Nadia Lalami
  Fatima Zahrae El Allami

The following players received entry from the qualifying draw:
  Kiki Bertens
  Melinda Czink
  Garbiñe Muguruza Blanco
  Arina Rodionova

The following players received entry as lucky loser:
  Mathilde Johansson

Withdrawals
  Polona Hercog
  Ekaterina Makarova
  Ksenia Pervak

Retirements
  Fatima Zahrae El Allami (gastro intestinal illness)
  Svetlana Kuznetsova (left thigh injury)
  Patricia Mayr-Achleitner (right hip injury)
  Arina Rodionova (left wrist injury)

Doubles main draw entrants

Seeds

1 Rankings are as of April 16, 2012

Other entrants
The following pairs received wildcards into the doubles main draw:
  Melinda Czink /  Chanelle Scheepers
  Fatima Zahrae El Allami /  Nadia Lalami
The following pair received entry as alternates:
  Kiki Bertens /  Arantxa Rus

Withdrawals
  Klára Zakopalová

Retirements
  Arina Rodionova (left wrist injury)

Finals

Singles

 Kiki Bertens defeated  Laura Pous Tió, 7–5, 6–0
It was Bertens' first career title.

Doubles

 Petra Cetkovská /  Alexandra Panova defeated  Irina-Camelia Begu /  Alexandra Cadanțu, 3–6, 7–6(7–5), [11–9]

External links
 Official website
 Singles draw
 Doubles draw

Grand Prix SAR La Princesse Lalla Meryem
Morocco Open
2012 in Moroccan tennis